Zhu Chenhao (1 July 1476 – 12 January 1521), or Prince of Ning, art name Weitian (畏天), was a member of the Ming dynasty's imperial family. He was the 5th generation descendant of Zhu Quan, the 17th son of the Hongwu Emperor. He attempted to usurp the throne and was the leader of the Prince of Ning rebellion.

Early years
Zhu Chenhao was not a military man, but had literary talents and was a pleasure seeker. However, he was cunning and ambitious like almost all other princes, aiming to become emperor. Zhu Chenhao succeeded to the title "Prince of Ning" in 1499 from his father, Zhu Jinjun in the Hongzhi's era. The title was hereditary, from their ancestor Zhu Quan, the first Prince of Ning. Zhu Chenhao lived in Jiangxi province, far away from the Ming capital.

Rebellion

Zhu Chenhao had long intended to rebel, but he did not have an army or even bodyguards. This situation started with his ancestor Zhu Quan. At that time, when the Yongle Emperor acceded to the throne he relocated Zhu Quan (1st Prince of Ning) to Beijing. Then, to prevent Zhu Quan's rebellion, his army and bodyguards were withdrawn and never restored until Zhu Chenhao's tenure.

In the summer of 1507, in the Zhengde's era, Zhu Chenhao sent a eunuch to Beijing with an enormous bribe for Liu Jin. The prince wanted Liu Jin to restore his princely bodyguards and its revenues in return for the bribe. Although the Ministry of War objected, the princely bodyguard was restored but it was withdrawn again in September 1510, the day before Liu Jin was executed. Zhu Chenhao was undaunted. He tried again to restore his army in 1514 through the Ministry of War, Lu Wan. Several years before, Lu Wan was an officer in Jiangxi and supporter to the prince. Lu Wan agreed to do it, but Grand Secretary Fei Hong refused to sign the draft; in other words he did not approve the request since he knew what the prince would do. However, the prince had plotted with some imperial officials such as Qian Ning, Cang Xian, several eunuchs and some of the Zhengde Emperor's personal staff to cheat Fei Hong. The plot was a success, Fei Hong was befooled and the Imperial decree was issued, the prince bodyguards being restored.

In June 1514, the prince requested seals to give him authority to control the military army in his region. He also recruited hundreds of bandits to become his henchmen. In August 1514, Zhu Chenhao requested authority to punish guilty Imperial clansmen. With recommendation from Lu Wan, the Zhengde Emperor agreed. By this time, the Prince of Ning referred to himself as ruler, his bodyguards as Imperial attendants and his order as imperial edicts. He also order local officials to wear formal court robes when attending to him. Governor of Jiangxi, speaking on behalf of his subordinates, said that it would be improper and refused to do it.

Zhu Chenhao began to recruit strategists and advisors to his cause. His principal advisor was a provincial examination graduate versed in military strategy. Local officials who refused to support the prince were eliminated. A Judicial Intendant of Jiangxi who reported the prince's treason to the court, was arrested and killed. Under these circumstances, other local officials cooperated and said nothing. In May 1517 several eunuchs from Zhu Chenhao's household secretly went to Beijing to report his unlawful activities. Commander of Imperial bodyguard Qian Ning reported this to the prince, then the eunuchs were arrested and beaten to die before reaching their objective.

In July 1519, when Zhu Chenhao was attending a banquet in honor of his birthday, a spy arrived from Beijing with the news that high officials had been sent to arrest him, for that was what had been rumored in Beijing. He left the banquet at once and called an urgent meeting of his advisors. They all agreed that the prince's plot was known, and could not wait any longer to take action. On 10 July 1519, Zhu Chenhao assembled local officials and announced that eunuch Li Guang had fooled the Hongzhi Emperor into thinking that the Zhengde Emperor was his son. According to him, the person on the throne was the child of a commoner. The prince also announced that he had received an edict from the empress to punish those bandits. Sun Sui, governor of Jiangxi asked the prince to show the empress's edict, but he was rejected. Then Sun Sui accused the prince of treason. Sun Sui and several officials who refused to cooperate were executed summarily.

The prince's army issued out from his headquarters, the city of Nanchang, to secure the route to the Yangtze River. Jiujiang city fell on 13 July and the prefectural city of Anqing was besieged on 23 July. When this news reached Wang Yangming, governor of Southern Jiangxi at that time, he soon took action. Wang Yangming spread a false report that a huge Imperial army from Beijing was marching to Nanchang. The Prince of Ning did not dare to leave his headquarters for several days until he realized it was a false report. On 9 August, the rebel Prince and his main army reached Anqing and besieged the city over ten days. After many lives were lost, Anqing city still could not be taken. On 13 August, Wang Yangming and his army reached Nanchang. The prince's headquarters was not garrisoned well and only a few soldiers of the army defended the city. Soon after the siege of Nanchang news reached Zhu Chenhao, he ordered a retreat from Anqing and back to Nanchang to protect his base.

Wang Yangming stormed Nanchang and had a serious battle with the Prince of Ning. Then on 20 August, the rebel Prince and his army were totally defeated by Wang. The prince was going to flee with a small boat but it was discovered by Wang. Wang burned the boat before the prince reached it, and soon the prince was captured. Wang Yangming successfully put down the uprising that lasted for forty days.

Death
All allies of the Prince of Ning were captured, including the commander of the Imperial guard, Qian Ning and the Minister of War, Lu Wan. Both were punished by death by slicing. The Imperial status of Zhu Chenhao was removed in 1519 and he was allowed to take his own life on 12 January 1521, after which his corpse was burned. All of the prince's family members were also executed, except a few who fled.

See also
 Zhengde Emperor
 Prince of Anhua
 Wang Yangming

References
 The Cambridge History of China, Vol. 7: The Ming Dynasty, 1368–1644, Part I, "The Prince of Ning Treason" by Frederick W. Mote and Denis Twitchett.

1476 births
1521 deaths
Ming dynasty imperial princes
Ming dynasty rebels
Executed people from Jiangxi
Executed royalty
Rebellious princes
16th-century executions by China